During the 1906–07 Scottish football season, Celtic competed in the Scottish First Division and the Scottish Cup, winning both competitions. The Celtic team did not concede a goal in any of their first six league matches, a record which stood until beaten by Rangers 114 years later, at the start of the 2020–21 Scottish Premiership season.

Results

Scottish First Division

Scottish Cup

References

Scottish football championship-winning seasons
Celtic F.C. seasons
Celtic